Domingo Rafael Tapia (born August 4, 1991) is a Dominican professional baseball pitcher in the San Diego Padres organization. He has previously played in Major League Baseball (MLB) for the Boston Red Sox, Seattle Mariners, Kansas City Royals and Oakland Athletics.

Career

New York Mets
On May 28, 2010, Tapia signed with the New York Mets organization as an international free agent. Tapia began his professional baseball career in 2010, pitching in the Dominican Summer League and the Gulf Coast League. He split the 2011 season between the rookie ball Kingsport Mets and the Low-A Brooklyn Cyclones, recording a 6-5 record and 3.38 ERA in 12 games. In 2012, Tapia spent the year in Single-A with the Savannah Sand Gnats, posting a 6-5 record and 3.98 ERA in 20 appearances. In 2013, he spent the season with the High-A St. Lucie Mets, pitching to a 3-9 record and 4.62 ERA in 101.1 innings of work. He played in 21 games for St. Lucie the following year, posting a 6-8 record and 3.96 ERA. Tapia began the 2015 season with the Double-A Binghamton Mets, but after giving up five hits, eight walks, two HBP, and nine runs in 1.2 innings, he underwent Tommy John surgery in May 2015. He appeared in 19 games with St. Lucie in 2016, also making 1 appearances for Binghamton, registering a 0-2 record and 3.56 ERA with 25 strikeouts. On November 7, 2016, he elected free agency.

Cincinnati Reds
On November 28, 2016, Tapia signed a minor league contract with the Cincinnati Reds organization. In 2017, he split the season between the Triple-A Louisville Bats and the Double-A Pensacola Blue Wahoos, posting a 4-7 record and 4.08 ERA with 85 strikeouts between the two clubs. In 2018, Tapia again split the year between Louisville and Pensacola, recording a 4-5 record and 3.60 ERA in 48 appearances. On November 2, 2018, he elected free agency.

Boston Red Sox
On November 16, 2018, Tapia signed a minor league deal with the Boston Red Sox organization. In 2019, he played for the Pawtucket Red Sox, Boston's Triple-A affiliate, posting a 5–4 win–loss record in 44 games (1 start) with two saves, a 5.18 earned run average (ERA), and 52 strikeouts in 66 innings pitched. Through 2019, including with Pawtucket, Tapia appeared in 242 games in 10 seasons of Minor League Baseball, accruing a 38–50 record with 4.14 ERA and four saves. He also played four seasons in the Dominican Winter League, with Gigantes del Cibao.

During the delayed-start  major league season, Tapia was added to Boston's player pool at the end of June. On September 11, he was added to Boston's major league active roster. He made his MLB debut that day, against the Tampa Bay Rays; the first batter he faced, Nate Lowe, hit a home run. Tapia was placed on the injured list before Boston's final series of the season, due to a right biceps contusion. Overall with the 2020 Red Sox, Tapia appeared in five games, all in relief, recording a 2.08 ERA and four strikeouts in  innings pitched.

Seattle Mariners
On October 23, 2020, Tapia was claimed off waivers by the Seattle Mariners. Tapia threw two scoreless innings with Seattle before being designated for assignment on May 17, 2021.

Kansas City Royals
On May 22, 2021, Tapia was traded to the Kansas City Royals in exchange for cash considerations. Tapia made 32 appearances for Kansas City in 2021, posting a 4-1 record and 2.84 ERA with 25 strikeouts in 31.2 innings pitched.

He was assigned to the Triple-A Omaha Storm Chasers to begin the 2022 season. He logged a 3.60 ERA in 5 games for Omaha before he was designated for assignment by the Royals on April 24, 2022 following the acquisition of Matt Peacock.

Oakland Athletics
On April 30, 2022, Tapia was claimed off waivers by the Oakland Athletics. The Athletics promoted Tapia to the major leagues on May 29. On September 11, Tapia was designated for assignment and was sent outright to Triple-A. He elected free agency on November 10, 2022.

San Diego Padres
On January 15, 2023, Tapia signed a minor league deal with the San Diego Padres.

References

External links

1991 births
Living people
Sportspeople from Santo Domingo
Major League Baseball players from the Dominican Republic
Dominican Republic expatriate baseball players in the United States
Major League Baseball pitchers
Boston Red Sox players
Seattle Mariners players
Kansas City Royals players
Oakland Athletics players
Dominican Summer League Mets players
Gulf Coast Mets players
Kingsport Mets players
Brooklyn Cyclones players
Savannah Sand Gnats players
St. Lucie Mets players
Gigantes del Cibao players
Binghamton Mets players
Pensacola Blue Wahoos players
Louisville Bats players
Pawtucket Red Sox players
Tacoma Rainiers players
Omaha Storm Chasers players